A Kreisstraße (literally: "district road" or "county road") is a class of road in Germany. It carries traffic between the towns and villages within a Kreis or district or between two neighbouring districts. In importance, the Kreisstraße ranks below a Landesstraße (or, in Bavaria and Saxony, a Staatstraße, i.e. a state road), but above a Gemeindestraße or "local road". Kreisstraßen are usually the responsibility of the respective rural district (Landkreis) or urban district (Kreisfreie Stadt), with the exception of high streets through larger towns and villages. Kreisstraßen are usually dual-lane roads but, in a few cases, can be built as limited-access dual carriageways in densely populated areas.

Numbering 
Unlike local roads (Gemeindestraßen) the Kreisstraßen are invariably numbered, but their numbering is not shown on signs. The abbreviation is a prefixed capital letter K followed by a serial number. In most states the car number plate prefix for the district is placed in front of the road number instead, for example in Bavaria. The Kreisstraßen are numbered in the individual federal states as follows:

See also 
 Autobahn
 Bundesstraße
 Landesstraße
 Gemeindestraße

Sources

External links 
 Road designation of federal, state and district roads in Bavaria (pdf file; 641 kB) 
 List of Kreisstraßen in theSchleswig-Holstein district of  Steinburg 

Roads in Germany